Sphaerodactylus nicholsi,  also known commonly as Nichols least gecko, Nichol's dwarf sphaero or the Puerto Rican crescent sphaero, is a species of lizard in the family Sphaerodactylidae . The species is endemic to Puerto Rico.

Etymology
The specific name, nicholsi, is in honor of American ichthyologist John Treadwell Nichols.

Habitat
The preferred habitats of S. nicholsi are forest, shrubland, and marine intertidal, but it may also be found in introduced vegetation.

Reproduction
Sphaerodactylus nicholsi is oviparous.

References

Further reading
Grant C (1931). "The sphaerodactyls of Porto Rico, Culebra and Mona Islands". Journal of the Department of Agriculture, Porto Rico 15: 199–213. (Sphaerodactylus nicholsi, new species, p. 204).
Rösler (2000). "Kommentierte Liste der rezent, subrezent und fossil bekannten Geckotaxa (Reptilia: Gekkonomorpha)". Gekkota 2: 28–153. (Sphaerodactylus nicholsi, p. 113). (in German).
Schwartz A, Henderson RW (1991). Amphibians and Reptiles of the West Indies: Descriptions, Distributions, and Natural History. Gainesville, Florida: University of Florida Press. 720 pp. . (Sphaerodactylus nicholsi, p. 511).
Schwartz A, Thomas R (1975). A Check-list of West Indian Amphibians and Reptiles. Carnegie Museum of Natural History Special Publication No. 1. Pittsburgh, Pennsylvania: Carnegie Museum of Natural History. 216 pp. (Sphaerodactylus nicholsi, p. 156).

Sphaerodactylus
Reptiles of Puerto Rico
Endemic fauna of Puerto Rico
Reptiles described in 1931
Taxa named by Chapman Grant